CBC Toronto refers to:
CBLA-FM, CBC Radio One on 99.1 FM
CBL-FM, CBC Radio 2 on 94.1 FM
CBLT-DT, CBC Television on channel 5

SRC Toronto refers to:
CJBC, Première Chaîne on 860 AM
CJBC-FM, Espace musique on 90.3 FM
CBLFT-DT, Ici Radio-Canada Télé on channel 25

See also:
Canadian Broadcasting Centre, the main CBC/Radio-Canada premises in Toronto